Ivy Township is a township in Lyon County, Kansas, United States.

History
Ivy Township was founded in 1886.

References

Townships in Lyon County, Kansas
Townships in Kansas